Csaba Steig (born 12 June 1971) is a Hungarian former cyclist. He competed in the individual road race at the 1992 Summer Olympics.

Major results
1991
 1st Overall Grand Prix Cycliste de Gemenc
1992
 1st Overall Grand Prix Cycliste de Gemenc
1996
 3rd Road race, National Road Championships
1999
 2nd Road race, National Road Championships
2000
 2nd Road race, National Road Championships
2001
 1st  Road race, National Road Championships
2002
 1st Stage 3 Paths of King Nikola

References

External links
 

1971 births
Living people
Hungarian male cyclists
Olympic cyclists of Hungary
Cyclists at the 1992 Summer Olympics
People from Szekszárd
Sportspeople from Tolna County